The Battle of Campo delle Mosche (Battle of the Field of the Flies) took place on 23 July 1359 in the district of Pontedera in the state of Pisa, Italy between the forces of Florence and those of the mercenary Great Company. It resulted in a victory for the Florentine forces.

Starting Operations
In 1359 Florence reacted to extortion threats by the Great Company under Konrad von Landau by assembling an army, with the help of Padua, Milan, Ferrara, and Naples, to oppose them. The Great Company had 500 cavalry and 1,000 Hungarian foot soldiers whilst the Florentine forces under the command of Pandolfo Malatesta numbered 3,000 cavalry, 500 Hungarians, and 2,500 archers.

The battle
The Company troops established themselves in a defended position at Campo delle Mosche. But after being besieged by Malatesta for several days with no food or water they broke up and fled.

References

 This article is based on the equivalent article on Italian Wikipedia.

Bibliography

 Stato Maggiore Esercito - Ufficio Storico. Niccolò Giorgetti. Le Armi Toscane e le occupazioni straniere in Toscana., 1916, Unione Arti Grafiche, Roma;
 Stato Maggiore Esercito - Ufficio Storico. Flavio Russo. La difesa costiera dello Stato dei Reali presidi di Toscana dal XIV al XIX secolo, 2002, Roma;
 Franco Cardini - Marco Tangheroni. Guerra e guerrieri nella Toscana del Rinascimento, 1990, Edifir, Firenze;
 Archivio di Stato di Firenze. La Toscana dei Lorena nelle mappe dell'Archivio di Stato di Praga. Memorie ed immagini di un Granducato. 1991, Firenze.
 Michael Mallett. Mercenaries and their Masters: Warfare in Renaissance Italy, 1974

1359 in Europe
14th century in the Republic of Florence
Campo delle Mosche
Conflicts in 1359